The 2011 Formula Lista Junior season (an open wheel racing motor sport series based in mainland Europe), was the twelfth Formula Lista Junior season. It began on 16 April at the Hockenheimring and ended on 25 September at Autodromo Nazionale Monza after twelve races. Philip Ellis won the drivers' championship and Daltec Racing won the teams' championship.

Teams and drivers
 All cars are powered by BMW engines, and Mygale chassis.

Race calendar and results

Championship standings

Drivers' championship

Teams' championship

References

External links
 Official website

Formula Lista Junior
Formula Lista Junior
Formula Lista Junior
Lista Junior